WG Film (former Westman & Gertten AB) is a Swedish production company that produces national and international documentaries. The company is located in Malmö and was founded in 1994 by documentary filmmaker Lars Westman and journalist Fredrik Gertten.

WG Film produces documentaries for broadcast and cinema. The early films of the company were often local stories with global relevance. With time, the films have become more and more international. Most notable films include Bikes vs Cars (2015) on cycling and the car industry's control over city planning, Bananas!* (2009) on a conflict between the Dole Food Company and banana plantation workers in Nicaragua as well as its sequel Big Boys Gone Bananas!* (2012) on Dole Food's lawsuit against Gertten, WG Film and the films' producer Margarete Jangård.

WG Film's movies have been shown at festivals such as Sundance Film Festival, South by Southwest and International Documentary Film Festival Amsterdam.

Productions 
 2017 - Dead Donkeys Fear No Hyenas
 2016 - Becoming Zlatan
 2015 - Bikes vs Cars
 2013 - Maria and Her Shadow
 2012 - The Invisible Bicycle Helmet (short)
 2012 - Big Boys Gone Bananas!*
 2011 - Love Always, Carolyn
 2010 - I Bought a Rain Forest
 2009 - Bananas!*
 2008 - The Leftovers
 2007 - Milk Bar
 2006 - Thin Ice
 2006 - Belfast Girls
 2005 - An Ordinary Family
 2005 - The Socialist, the Architect and the Twisted Tower
 2003 - Just a Piece of Steel
 2003 - Love Boat
 2002 - The Way Back - True Blue 2
 2002 - Boogie Woogie Daddy
 2001 - The Poetry General
 2000 - Travel with Siluette
 2000 - The Death of a Working Man's Newspaper
 2000 - The Great Bridge
 2000 - Walking on Water
 1998 - True Blue
 1998 - Samba Football
 1995 - Malmö - Montevideo, my place in this world

Awards 

Bikes vs Cars -
 2015 - UK Green Film Fest's Audience Award Audience Award
 2015 - Docs Against Gravity Film Festival - Special Mention
 2015 - Tempo Documentary Award - Honourable Mention
 2015 - ciwem.org Green Ribbon Political Awards
 2015 - San Francisco Green Film Festival - Best Feature

Big Boys Gone Bananas -
 2010 - Sarasota Film Festival - Winner for Best Documentary
 2012 - One World Film Festival - Winner of Audience Award and The Rudolf Vrba Jury Award
 2012 - Hotdocs - Top Ten Audience Favourite
 2012 - Sarasota fest annual Florida ceremony - Best Documentary
 MIFF Awards - Winner of Best Documentary and Best Film

Co-productions 
 2014 - The Man Who Saved the World
 2011 - Love Addict
 2008 - Burma VJ
 2008 - Final Image

References

External links 
 WG Film
 Fredrik Gertten at the Internet Movie Database
 Fredrik Gertten at the Swedish Film Database

1994 establishments in Sweden
Companies based in Malmö
Mass media companies established in 1994
Documentary film production companies
Film production companies of Sweden